Gladstone High School is a public high school located at 1340 North Enid Avenue in Covina, California, United States. It is part of the Azusa Unified School District and enrolls 1,366 students. The school was accredited in 2013 and will be through 2019 by the Western Association of Schools and Colleges (WASC). The athletic teams of Gladstone High are known as the Gladiators and compete in the Montview League of the CIF Southern Section. Advanced Placement (AP) courses are available in Calculus AB, Calculus BC, Spanish Language, Spanish Literature, World History, U.S. History, English Literature, Studio Art, Art History, English Language, Statistics, and Biology. The school also has a JROTC program. In the 2017–18 school year the school was 93% Hispanic, 4% White, 3% Asian, 0.5% Black, 0.4%, Two or More Races, 0.2% American Indian/Alaskan Native Enrollment, and 0.1% Hawaiian Native/Pacific Islander. Alumni of the school have graduated from prestigious undergraduate institutions like University of California, Berkeley, University of Southern California, University of California, Los Angeles, University of California, San Diego, University of Chicago, Duke University, University of Notre Dame, New York University, Massachusetts Institute of Technology, etc.

Notable alumni
 Jack Clark (class of 1973) — Major League Baseball player
 Ivan Misner —  founder and Chairman of business networking organization BNI

References

External links

High schools in Los Angeles County, California
Covina, California
Azusa, California
Education in Los Angeles County, California
Public high schools in California
1964 establishments in California